Pir Hayati (also Romanized as Pīr Ḩayātī) is a village in Robat Rural District, in the Central District of Khorramabad County, Lorestan Province, Iran. At the 2006 census, its population was 165, in 31 families.

References 

Towns and villages in Khorramabad County